Luca Cadalora (born 17 May 1963) is an Italian former professional motorcycle racer who is the  125 cc World Champion,  and  250 cc World Champion and 8-time Premier Class race winner. He competed in  Grand Prix motorcycle racing from 1984 to 2000.

Racing career
Born in Modena, Emilia Romagna, Cadalora began his professional motorcycle racing career in 1984, riding an MBA in the 125cc world championship. In 1986, he won the 125cc World Championship while riding for the Garelli factory racing team. His success earned him a promotion to the 250cc class with Giacomo Agostini's Marlboro Yamaha factory racing team in 1986. In 1991, Cadalora switched to the Rothmans Honda factory racing team and won the 250cc World Championship aboard an Erv Kanemoto-tuned Honda NSR250. He successfully defended his title with Honda in 1992, claiming his third world championship.

In 1993 he rose to the premier 500cc division as Wayne Rainey's teammate in the Kenny Roberts-Yamaha team. In three seasons on the Roberts Yamaha, he displayed flashes of brilliance, finishing as high as second to Mick Doohan in 1994. Cadalora rejoined Kanemoto for the 1996 season racing a Honda NSR500. Despite lacking any major sponsors, he still managed to finish the season in third place aboard the Kanemoto-Honda.

For the 1997 season, he got a contract as official Yamaha rider in the new Promotor Racing team backed by an Austrian businessman. However, after few races the team failed due to financial problems. WCM rescued the team with the help of a Red Bull sponsorship and Cadalora ended the season in sixth place. At the beginning of the 1998 season, WCM and Cadalora lost Yamaha official support. He returned to the Rainey-Yamaha works team for a few races to replace an injured Jean-Michel Bayle, then helped develop the new MuZ race bike. In 1999 he was again with MuZ. Cadalora finished his career with Kenny Roberts' Modenas team in 2000.

He retired with 34 Grand Prix victories in three different classes.

Career statistics

Grand Prix motorcycle racing

By class

Races by year
(key) (Races in bold indicate pole position) (Races in italics indicate fastest lap)

Superbike World Championship

Races by year
(key) (Races in bold indicate pole position) (Races in italics indicate fastest lap)

References

Italian motorcycle racers
500cc World Championship riders
250cc World Championship riders
125cc World Championship riders
Sportspeople from Modena
1963 births
Living people
Superbike World Championship riders
250cc World Riders' Champions
125cc World Riders' Champions